The bronze-green euphonia (Euphonia mesochrysa) is a bird species in the family Fringillidae (formerly in Thraupidae).
It is found in Bolivia, Colombia, Ecuador, and Peru.
Its natural habitat is subtropical or tropical moist montane forests.

References

bronze-green euphonia
Birds of the Northern Andes
bronze-green euphonia
Taxonomy articles created by Polbot